The Italian composer Giacomo Puccini (1858–1924) is regarded as the natural successor to the tradition of Giuseppe Verdi and is considered the greatest Italian opera proponent of his time. Best known for his 12 operas, his style quickly departed from the predominant Romantic Italian style and he emerged as the most significant representative of verismo, a radically realist approach.

Operas

Other works
(by genre, categorized by date)

Art songs 
A te (c. 1875)
Plaudite populi (Lucca, 1877)
Credo (Lucca, 1878)
Vexilla Regis (1878)
Sole ed amore (1888)
Salve del ciel Regina (c. 1882)
Mentìa l’avviso (c. 1882)
Storiella d’amore (1883)
Piccolo valzer (1894)
Avanti Urania! (1896)
Scossa elettrica (1896)
Inno a Diana (1897)
E l'uccellino (1899)
Terra e mare (1902)
Canto d'anime (1904)
Dios y Patria (himno escolar, text in Spanish, 3 August 1905, Buenos Aires)
Casa mia, casa mia (1908)
Sogno d'or (1913)
Morire? (c. 1917) – This song was transposed by a half step (into G-flat major) and set to different text in the 1st revision of his work La rondine called "Parigi è la città dei desideri" which is sung by Ruggero in the 1st act. Besides the key and text changes, it is the exact music to the aria.
Inno a Roma (1 June 1919, Rome)

Orchestral 

 Preludio sinfonico in A Major (1876)
 Capriccio sinfonico (1883)
 Pezzi per organo e per pianoforte (1874-1878)
 Preludio Sinfonico in A major (Milan, 1882)
 Largo Adagietto in F major  (c. 1881–83)

Piano 

 Foglio d’Album in Bb Major
 Pezzo per pianoforte (1916)
 Fugues (c. 1883)
 Scherzo in D (1883)

Adagio in A major (1881)

Chamber 

Scherzo in A Minor for String Quartet (c.1880-1883)
String Quartet in D Major (c.1880-1883)
3 Minuetti for String Quartet (1881)
I Crisantemi for String Quartet (1892) (movement for string quartet, 1890, a Threnody "Alla memoria di Amedeo di Savoia Duca d'Aosta", composed in the course of a single night in memory of his friend the duke of Aosta)

Mass 

 Requiem (27 January 1905, Milan)
Messa a 4 voci con orchestra (Lucca, 1880) Published in 1951 as Messa di Gloria

Notes

References

Sources

External links

 
Lists of compositions by composer